Chaerophyllum hirsutum, hairy chervil, is a species of flowering plant belonging to the parsley family Apiaceae.

Its native range is Central and Southern Europe to Ukraine.

A cultivar 'Roseum', with pale pink flowers, is widely cultivated as an ornamental.

References

hirsutum